The Women's 50 metre breaststroke competition of the 2019 African Games was held on 21 August 2019.

Records
Prior to the competition, the existing world and championship records were as follows.

The following new records were set during this competition.

Results

Heats
The heats were started on 21 August at 10:45.

Final

The final was started on 21 August at 17:00.

References

Women's 50 metre breaststroke
2019 in women's swimming